Thomas Edward Brown (5 May 183029 October 1897), commonly referred to as T. E. Brown, was a late-Victorian scholar, schoolmaster, poet, and theologian from the Isle of Man.

Having achieved a double first at Christ Church, Oxford, and election as a fellow of Oriel in April 1854, Brown served first as headmaster of The Crypt School, Gloucester, then as a young master at the fledgling Clifton College, near Bristol (influencing, among others, poet W. E. Henley at The Crypt School. Writing throughout his teaching career, Brown developed a poetry corpus—with Fo'c's'le Yarns (1881), The Doctor (1887), The Manx Witch (1889), and Old John (1893)—of narrative poetry in Anglo-Manx, the historic dialect of English spoken on the Isle of Man that incorporates elements of Manx Gaelic. It was Brown's role in creating the verse, with scholarly use of language shaping a distinct regional poetic form—featuring a fervour of patriotism and audacious and naturally pious philosophy of life unique to the islands, and interspersing pauses and irregularity of rhythm, an emotive admixture of mirth and sorrow, and a tenderness described by Quiller-Couch as rugged—that earned him the appellation of "Manx national poet". Retiring in 1892 to focus on writing, Brown died in 1897 (age 67), while again at the rostrum during a return visit to Clifton.

Life

Brown was born on 5 May 1830 at Douglas, Isle of Man, the sixth of ten children born to Reverend Robert Brown and his wife, Dorothy. His elder brother became the Baptist preacher, pastor and reformer Hugh Stowell Brown (10 August 182324 February 1886). The family moved to Kirk Braddan when Thomas was two years old.

Brown's father is described as a rather "stern, undemonstrative, evangelical preacher". As Rev. Brown was partially blind, he employed his sons in reading to him from a wide variety of works, excepting novels. Brown undertook the boy's education, assisted by the parish schoolmaster. Young Brown was a shy and timid boy; the family gardener instilled in him a love of nature, and introduced him to Scott's Waverley Novels. At the age of fifteen, Thomas went to King William's College in Castletown. It was at this time that he began to write poetry.

Arthur Quiller-Couch writes:

Brown left the Isle soon afterward, c. 1857, to accept the position of headmaster of The Crypt School, in Gloucester, where a commission had, through the hiring and other efforts, been attempting to revive the school. Brown was viewed as brilliant and academically distinguished; while his tenure at the school was relatively brief (c. 1857–1863)—he reportedly found the burden of administration at the school intolerable—he made a profound impact in this period, including on William Ernest Henley with whom he overlapped from 1861 to 1863. Years later, after becoming a successful published poet (e.g., of Invictus and other works), Henley would recall Headmaster Brown as a "revelation" and "a man of genius ... the first I'd ever seen", and would eulogise his passing as one "singularly kind … at a moment … I needed kindness even more than I needed encouragement."

Quiller-Couch continues:

Hence, Brown created a distinct regional poetic form close to its native language, with scholarly use of the language, unique pacing and irregularity of rhythm, and a ruggedly tender admixture of mirth and sorrow that exhibited a fervent island patriotism and an audacious, naturally pious philosophy of life, a combination of man and art that earned him the appellation of "Manx national poet".

Works

Poetry

Fo'c's'le Yarns. Including the poem "Betsy Lee", First Edition, Macmillan, 1881. New Edition, Macmillan, 1889.
 The Doctor, and Other Poems, contains the title poem, as well as "Kitty of the Sherragh Vane" and "The Schoolmasters". The title poem is the source of the humorous doublet "Money is honey—my little sonny! / And a rich man's joke is allis funny!"
The Manx Witch, and other poems, Macmillan & Co., 1889.
Old John: And Other Poems. Including the poem "Indwelling" – "If thou couldst empty all thyself of self, Like to a shell dishabited, Then might He find thee on the Ocean shelf, And say—" This is not dead,"—..."
The Collected Poems of T. E. Brown, Macmillan & Co., 1900.
 Poems of T. E. Brown, 1922, a compilation of many of Brown's most important poetic works.

References and notes

Further reading
 Anon., 2015, "T E Brown – The Manx National Poet," at Medium (online), see , accessed 9 May 2015. 
 Neil Hultgren, 2014, Melodramatic Imperial Writing: From the Sepoy Rebellion to Cecil Rhodes, Athens, OH:Ohio University Press, pp. 5–7, 16, 24, and 93–127 passim, and corresponding notes, pp. 213–259 passim, see , accessed 12 May 2015. 
 MNHL, 2007, "The Manx National Poet: Thomas Edward Brown," at Manx National Heritage Library [Eiraght Ashoonagh Vannin], Public Information Sheet No.10, March 2007 [RS: 03.07], see , accessed 9 May 2015.
 Joanne Shattock, 1999, "Thomas Edward Brown 1830–97," in The Cambridge Bibliography of English Literature: 1800–1900, pp. 543f, 1989, Cambridge, U.K.:CUP,  (Volume 4 of The Cambridge Bibliography of English Literature), see , accessed 9 May 2015.
 Max Keith Sutto, 1991, The Drama of Storytelling in T.E. Brown's Manx Yarns, Newark, DE:University of Delaware Press, see , accessed 9 May 2015.
 Frederick Wilse Bateson, Ed., 1966 [1940], "Thomas Edward Brown (1830–1897)," in The Cambridge Bibliography of English Literature, Volume 2, p. 282, Cambridge, U.K.:CUP, see , accessed 9 May 2015.
 Arthur Quiller-Couch, Ed., 2015 [1930], "Thomas Edward Brown, Volumes 1830–1930," Cambridge, U.K.:Cambridge University Press, see , accessed 9 May 2015.  [Quote: "Originally published in 1930, this book contains recollections from the friends of the Manx poet and theologian Thomas Edward Brown on the occasion of the centenary of his birth. The volume includes a preface from the then Lieutenant Governor of the Isle of Man, Sir Claude Hill, as well as some unpublished letters written by Browne and a brief biography written by Sir Arthur Quiller-Couch."]
 Brown, T. E. & Irwin, Sidney Thomas, (Ed.), 1900, "Letters of Thomas Edward Brown, author of 'Fo'c'sle yarns,'" Vol. 1, Westminster:A. Constable and Co., see , accessed 9 May 2015.
 Derek Winterbottom, T. E. Brown: his life and legacy (The Manx Experience, Douglas, 1997)

External links

 Collected Poems of T. E. Brown, online
 
 

1830 births
1897 deaths
Manx poets
Fellows of Oriel College, Oxford
People educated at King William's College
People from Douglas, Isle of Man
Manx culture
19th-century poets
19th-century Manx writers
Alumni of Christ Church, Oxford